Nathalie "Lily" Sergueiew (January 24, 1912 – May 17, 1950) was a double agent who worked for MI5 during World War II under the codename "Treasure". She played a significant role in the Double-Cross System, particularly by deceiving the Germans about the location of the D-Day landings.

Early life
Sergueiew was born in Saint Petersburg, Russian Empire (niece of General Yevgeny Miller), but her family fled to France following the Russian Revolution in 1917. She was educated in Paris, and trained as a journalist, being fluent in English, French and German. During the mid-1930s she travelled extensively throughout Germany, and once interviewed Hermann Göring.

WWII
An attempt was made to recruit her by the German intelligence service in 1937, but she refused. However, after the fall of France she agreed to work for the Abwehr. Her case officer, Major Emil Kliemann, trained her in intelligence gathering and communications techniques, and in 1943 she travelled to Spain, taking her beloved dog “Frisson” with her. Sergueiew promptly contacted the MI5 representative in Madrid and reported herself as a German spy and offered to work for British Intelligence. She was accepted, and travelled to England. Unfortunately British quarantine regulations meant that Frisson was left behind at Gibraltar.

Sergueiew was given the code-name "Treasure" and handled by MI5 officer Mary Sherer. "Treasure" turned out to be an effective agent, but was also described as "exceptionally temperamental and troublesome". She revealed her role as a double agent to her American boyfriend, and threatened to quit unless MI5 arranged for her dog to be brought from Spain. Matters came to a head in May 1944 when "Treasure" learned that Frisson had died. She informed MI5 that she had a secret signal, which would indicate to Kliemann that she was under British control, and threatened to use it in revenge for the death of her dog. After a tumultuous meeting with Colonel T. A. Robertson, head of the section responsible for control of the Double Cross agents, she eventually revealed the secret code. "Treasure" continued to work for MI5, sending the Germans false information until a week after D-Day, when she was informed that her services were no longer required. However, MI5 continued transmitting messages from her for another five months. Perhaps the most important part of her work was that her long messages were re-encrypted in the German Enigma machines. This provided Bletchley Park with excellent cribs for the Cryptanalysis of the Enigma used by other Abwehr networks.

Sergueiew returned to France in late 1944, where she served in the French Women's Army Service.

Later life
After the war she wrote a revealing memoir, describing her former MI5 employers as "gangsters". Her memoirs, entitled Secret Service Rendered, were eventually published in 1968.

While she was serving as a Russian language interpreter for Major John Barton Collings, the two fell in love and were married in Paris in 1946. At that time Collings was serving as the Military Governor of Erfurt, Germany, with responsibility for relocating the survivors of nearby Buchenwald, many of whom were Russians. Later they moved to Solon Township, MI, where Nathalie died on 17 May 1950 from kidney failure.

References

1912 births
1950 deaths
Abwehr
Double-Cross System
French people of Russian descent
Journalists from Paris
Emigrants from the Russian Empire to France
Emigrants from the Russian Empire to the United States
World War II spies for Germany
World War II spies for the United Kingdom